Morogoro Airstrip  is an airstrip serving the city of Morogoro in the Morogoro Region of Tanzania. The airstrip location is just off the western side of the prohibited airspace (HTP6) of the Ngerengere Air Force Base but lies within the restricted airspace (HTR7).

Airlines and destinations

See also

List of airports in Tanzania
Transport in Tanzania

References

External links
Tanzania Airports Authority
OpenStreetMap - Morogoro
OurAirports - Morogoro Airport

Airstrips in Tanzania
Buildings and structures in the Morogoro Region